Hamza Robertson (born Tom Robertson) is an English singer who is signed to and managed by Andante Records.

Early life
Tom Robertson was born in Chadderton, Greater Manchester, England, he was brought up in a Christian family environment. From an early age, he involved himself in music and the performing arts. He was a part of the local theatre workshop, where he wrote music and acted in plays. He took part in bands beyond college, playing instruments and writing music.

He studied performing arts and popular music for three years until the age of 20.

Career
In 2003, at the age of 21, Robertson converted to Islam and adopted the name Hamza.

In November 2006, he performed at the Global Peace and Unity Event in ExCeL Exhibition Centre in London organised by Islam Channel.

In July 2007, Robertson released his first album Something About Life, by Awakening Records.

Robertson also has a daytime job with a telephone company.

Discography

Albums

See also
Islamic music
Nasheed
List of converts to Islam

References

External links

Hamza Robertson on Songkick

Hamza Robertson on Last.fm

Hamza Robertson on Awakening
Hamza Robertson on Awakening Entertainment
Hamza Robertson on Awakening Records
Hamza Robertson on Youtube

1982 births
Living people
English Muslims
English Sufis
Converts to Islam from Christianity
English former Christians
English male singers
Nasheed singers
People from Chadderton
Awakening Music artists
21st-century English singers
21st-century British male singers
Rotana Records artists